In United States agricultural policy, the Ground and Surface Water Conservation Program (GSWCP) is a new component of Environmental Quality Incentives Program (EQIP) enacted in the 2002 farm bill (P.L. 107-171, Sec. 2301) to improve irrigation and water use efficiency, and reduce water use by agriculture. Mandatory funding from the Commodity Credit Corporation (CCC) starts at $25 million in FY2002, and increases to $60 million annually between FY2004 and FY2007. In addition, $50 million is to go to the Klamath Basin in Oregon and California to carry out water conservation activities.

References 

United States Department of Agriculture programs
Environmental policy in the United States